Larry A. Potts is an American former FBI agent who briefly served as Deputy Director of the Federal Bureau of Investigation in 1995. Potts was demoted due to investigation into two high-profile FBI controversies that he had been involved in: the 1992 standoff with American survivalist Randy Weaver in Idaho, and the 1993 standoff with the Texas Branch Davidian church led by David Koresh.

References

Living people
Deputy Directors of the Federal Bureau of Investigation
Year of birth missing (living people)